Mary Noel Streatfeild OBE  (24 December 1895 –11 September 1986) was an English author, best known for children's books including the "Shoes" books, which were not a series (though some books made references to others). Random House, the U.S. publisher of the 1936 novel Ballet Shoes (1936), published some of Streatfeild's subsequent children's books using the word "Shoes" in their titles, to capitalize on the popularity of Ballet Shoes; thus Circus Shoes (originally called The Circus Is Coming), Party Shoes (originally called Party Frock), Skating Shoes (originally called White Boots) and many more. She won the third annual Carnegie Medal for Circus Shoes. She was a member of the historic Streatfeild family.

Several of her novels have been adapted for film or television.

Biography
Noel Streatfeild was born in Sussex, the second of five surviving children of William Champion Streatfeild, later the Bishop of Lewes, and Janet Venn. Her life is described in three semi-autobiographical novels: A Vicarage Family, Away from the Vicarage and Beyond the Vicarage. Her elder sister Ruth Gervis illustrated Ballet Shoes. Noel was considered the "plain" sister in her family, but she shone in performances with her sisters for charity. Upon reaching adulthood she sought a career in theatre, and gained ten years of experience as an actress, working for the Charles Doran and Arthur Bourchier companies.  Her familiarity with the stage was the basis for many of her popular books for children, which are often about children struggling with careers in the arts.

Her first children's book was Ballet Shoes, published by J. M. Dent in 1936. She recalled, "The story poured off my pen, more or less telling itself ... I distrusted what came easily and so despised the book." It was a commended runner-up for the inaugural Carnegie Medal from the Library Association, recognising the year's best British children's book, and it launched a successful career in writing for children. For her third book and third "Shoes" novel, The Circus Is Coming (later published as Circus Shoes), she won the 1938 Carnegie Medal.

She was appointed an Officer of the Order of the British Empire (OBE) in 1983.

Adaptations
Aunt Clara was filmed in 1954 with Margaret Rutherford in the title role.

In 1968 London Weekend Television produced a six-episode serial of The Growing Summer, with Wendy Hiller as Aunt Dymphna. It was filmed in Bantry (Bantry House), in Ahakista and near Kilcrohane on the Sheep's Head Peninsula in County Cork, Republic of Ireland.

Thursday's Child was adapted for television by the BBC in 1972.

Ballet Shoes was made into a 6-episode television series by the BBC in 1975. In 2007 it was made into a feature-length film for BBC One (UK). A Granada production was adapted by the screenwriter Heidi Thomas and starred Emilia Fox as Sylvia Brown, Victoria Wood as Nana, Emma Watson as Pauline Fossil, Yasmin Paige as Petrova Fossil, Lucy Boynton as Posy Fossil and Richard Griffiths as Great Uncle Matthew.

Noel Streatfeild also wrote 12 romance novels under the pen name "Susan Scarlett".

Allusions in other works
Noel Streatfeild was recommended by Meg Ryan's character in the 1998 film You've Got Mail. "Noel Streatfeild wrote Ballet Shoes and Skating Shoes and Theatre Shoes and Dancing Shoes and...I'd start with Ballet Shoes first. It's my favorite ... although Skating Shoes is completely wonderful. But it's out of print."

Works discovered posthumously 
Two unpublished short stories by Streatfeild were set to be published by Virago Press in November 2018 and mid-2019 after they were discovered by Streatfeild's nephew, William Streatfeild, and Donna Coonan, the editorial director of Virago Press.

Selected works

Children's fiction
 Ballet Shoes (1936)
 Tennis Shoes (1937)
 The Circus Is Coming (1938), also published as Circus Shoes
 The House in Cornwall (1940), also published in the US as The Secret of the Lodge (1940)
 The Children of Primrose Lane (1941), also published as The Stranger in Primrose Lane
 Curtain Up (1944), also published as Theater Shoes
 Party Frock (1946), also published as Party Shoes
 The Painted Garden (1949), significantly abridged and published in the U.S. as Movie Shoes
 White Boots (1951), also published as Skating Shoes
 The Fearless Treasure (1953)
 The Bell Family (1954), also published as Family Shoes
 Wintle's Wonders (1957), also published as Dancing Shoes 
 New Town (1961)
 Apple Bough (1962), also published as Traveling Shoes
 A Vicarage Family (1963)
 The First Book of the Ballet (1963)
 The Children on the Top Floor (1964)
 Away from the Vicarage (1965)
 The Growing Summer (1966), also published as The Magic Summer
 Caldicott Place (1967), also published as The Family at Caldicott Place
 The "Gemma" series (1968–69)
 Thursday's Child (1970)
 Beyond the Vicarage (1971)
 Ballet Shoes for Anna (1972)
 When the Siren Wailed (1974)
 Far to Go (1976), sequel to Thursday's Child
 Meet the Maitlands (1978)
 The Maitlands: All Change at Cuckley Place (1979), sequel to the above

Adult fiction
 The Whicharts (1931)
 Parson's Nine (1932)
 Tops and Bottoms (1933)
 A Shepherdess of Sheep (1934)
 It Pays to Be Good (1936)
 Caroline England (1937)
 Luke (1939)
 The Winter is Past (1940)
 I Ordered a Table for Six (1942)
 Myra Carroll (1944)
 Saplings (1945) 
 Grass in Piccadilly (1947)
 Mothering Sunday (1950)
 Aunt Clara (1952), made into a 1954 film of the same title
 Judith (1956)
 The Silent Speaker (1961)

Adult fiction under the pseudonym Susan Scarlett
 Clothes-Pegs (1939)
 Sally-Ann (1939)
 Peter and Paul (1940)
 Ten Way Street (1940)
 The Man in the Dark (1940)
 Babbacombe (1941)
 Under the Rainbow (1941)
 Summer Pudding (1943)
 Murder While You Work (1944)
 Poppies for England (1947)
 Pirouette (1948)
 Love in a Mist (1951)

Nonfiction
 The Years of Grace (1950)
 Queen Victoria (1958)
 Magic and the Magician: E. Nesbit and her Children's Books (1958)
 The Boy Pharaoh, Tutankhamen (1972)
 Tea by the Nursery Fire (1976)

Edited
 Growing up Gracefully (1955), illustrated by John Dugan
 The Day Before Yesterday: Firsthand Stories of Fifty Years Ago (1956), illustrated by Dick Hart
 To the Garden of Delights (1960)

Ancestry and descendants

See also

Notes

References

External links
 The Noel Streatfeild homepage
 Collecting Books and Magazines Biography and images of early editions of Streatfeild's books
 A brief biography at elliemik.com 
 The Gemma Books by Noel Streatfeild from the h2g2 Edited Guide Entry
 The Fossil Cupboard The Noel Streatfeild discussion board
 The Whicharts at Margin Notes Books
 

Noel
1895 births
1986 deaths
English children's writers
20th-century English novelists
Carnegie Medal in Literature winners
Officers of the Order of the British Empire
People from Sussex